Bunga is a village in the pithoragarh District of Uttarakhand, India. The population of the village is 1461. 

Villages in Pithoragarh district